In bioinformatics, a genome browser is a graphical interface for display of information from a biological database for genomic data.  Genome browsers enable researchers to visualize and browse entire genomes with annotated data including gene prediction and structure, proteins, expression, regulation, variation, comparative analysis, etc. Annotated data is usually from multiple diverse sources.  They differ from ordinary biological databases in that they display data in a graphical format, with genome coordinates on one axis with annotations or space-filling graphics to show analyses of the genes, such as the frequency of the genes, their expression profiles, etc.

A large number of genome browsers are available, many of them free and with database accessible online. Among the best known are the UCSC Genome Browser, Ensembl Genome Browser and NCBI's Genome Data Viewer.  These genome browsers may support multiple genomes, however, other genome browsers may be specific for particular species. These browsers may provide summary of data from genomic databases and comparative assessment of different genetic sequences across multiple species, and allow the data to be visualised in various ways to facilitate assessment and interpretation of these complex data.

References

Genome databases
Genomics